The Penang Transport Master Plan was drawn up to address the deteriorating traffic conditions in Penang and is projected to cost RM46 billion.

History 
Penang is located on the northwest coast of Peninsular Malaysia and consists of Penang Island, where the capital city, George Town, is located, and Seberang Perai on the Malay Peninsula. With a population density in 2018 of  it has among the highest population densities in Malaysia and is one of the country's most urbanised states. Seberang Perai is Malaysia's second largest city by population. It has a relatively small area for development and has a high level of vehicle ownership which exacerbates the traffic conditions. It has been estimated by Anak Pinang (Children of Penang) that the average evening rush hour speeds in George Town were below 20kmph. In response to this, when the then newly elected Pakatan Rakyat took over Penang’s administration in 2009, a plan was developed to alleviate these problems. PTMP was part of the 4th pillar of the Penang2030 development vision, which talks to investing in the built environment.

In 2011, the Penang Transport Council (PTC) was formed.

In April 2011, the state government along with the Northern Corridor Implementation Agency appointed AJC Planning Consultants Sdn Bhd, Halcrow and the Singapore Cruise Centre to carry out the Penang Transport Master Plan Study.

In October 2012, four reports were submitted to the state government

 Public Transport Approach - proposed a transport network that included setting up hubs and park & ride stations, as well as a more comprehensive bus network, a bus rapid transit, trams and light rail transit (LRT).
 Highway-based Strategies - looked into how to improve the roads, the network and associated items that would support and complement the Public Transport Approach.
 Accessibility Report - argued that public transport would need to have accessibility in both urban and rural areas.
 Institutional Reforms - proposed policies and directions that could be led by the state government to implement transport strategies and policies.

In 2013, the Halcrow study was adopted by the Penang state government and a preliminary agreement was signed with Zenith Corporation.

In 2014, the Penang state government set out a request for proposal (RFP).

In August 2015, then Penang Chief Minister Lim Guan Eng announced that the SRS Consortium would be the project delivery partner (PDP) for the PTMP and had an estimated cost of about RM27 billion.

In July 2020, the Penang state government created the Penang Infrastructure Corporation Sdn Bhd, a special purpose vehicle which would lead the implementation of the PTMP. The board of directors would include Chief Minister Chow Kon Yeow, Penang State Secretary Datuk Abdul Razak Jaafar, and state Public Works, Utilities and Flood Mitigation Committee chairman Zairil Khir Johari.

Some RM100mil was allocated by the Pakatan Harapan government during Budget 2020 last October for the proposed Penang Hill cable car project.

In early June, the Federal Government announced it had cancelled funding for PTMP after Perikatan Nasional took over the Government.

On 20 June 2020, State Works Committee chairman Zairil Khir Johari said that Penang would forge ahead with projects under the RM46bil Penang Transport Master Plan (PTMP) even if funding from the Federal Government was not forthcoming.

On 1 July 2020, it was announced that Gamuda Bhd would be the project delivery partner (PDP) for the PTMP via its subsidiary SRS Consortium Sdn Bhd. The agreement includes the Bayan Lepas Light Rail Transit (LRT) project, Pan Island Link 1 and 2A Expressway (PIL 1 and PIL 2A), and the Penang South Reclamation (PSR) project.

Chief Minister Chow Kon Yeow said it would consider issuing its own bonds for the PSR project and that it would not need the federal to approve such a move. However, the President of the Consumers Association of Penang, Mohideen Abdul Kader, argued that the state government would be required to seek the federal government approval to pay for the PSR.

Elements of the Master Plan 
Penang has a small area for development and has a high level of vehicle ownership which exacerbates the traffic conditions. The Penang Transport Master Plan was drawn up by the Penang state government to address these issues by encouraging greater use of public transport through more rail-based systems throughout Penang at a cost of RM46 billion.

In order to finance the project, the state government would build 3 small islands to the south of the main Penang island via land reclamation, reaching the size of 1,738ha.

The Penang Transport Master Plan (PTMP) will involve several components

 3 highways named Pan Island Link 1 (PIL1), Pan Island Link 2 (PIL2) and Pan Island Link 2a (PIL2a)
A Light Rail Transit line between George Town and Bayan Lepas
 Two monorail lines that connect George Town with Air Itam, Paya Terubong and Tanjung Tokong
 A tram line limited to within George Town's UNESCO World Heritage Site
 Cross-strait cable car line linking Komtar in George Town and Penang Sentral in Butterworth
 Gelugor-Butterworth LRT across the strait
 Raja Uda to Bukit Mertajam monorail line
 Permatang Tinggi to Batu Kawan Bus Rapid Transit (BRT) line
 A 7.2 km long undersea tunnel linking Gurney Drive to the Butterworth. It is supposed to begin construction in 2023 at a cost of RM6.3 billion. In July 2020, Chief Minister Chow said that a decision to proceed would only be made after the feasibility study was completed.  The project was also at the centre of graft allegations against former Penang CM Lim.

Currently, the Light Rapid Transit line between George Town and the Penang International Airport, also known as the Bayan Lepas LRT line, is being allocated the top priority by the Penang state government. In April 2019, the LRT project was received conditional approval from the federal government. Construction is expected to start in June 2020.

Criticisms 
It was argued that rather than focusing on being a transport plan, it was actually cover for a reclamation scheme consisting of three islands to the south of Penang totalling 1,820 ha. called the Penang South Reclamation (PSR) project. Instead of using an open tender, a Request for Proposal was used instead. At the same time some have argued PSR will cause environmental damage. In July 2020, Chief Minister Chow Kon Yeow said that discussions for compensating fishermen affected by the PSR were still underway.

At RM 42 billion the total proposed cost the PTMP would make it the most expensive infrastructure project in Malaysia.

Annual ridership for the proposed LRT is projected to reach 42 million trips, when the local population is only around 800,000.

References 

Penang Integrated Transportation Masterplan

External Links